The 2016 TEB Ankara Cup was a professional tennis tournament played on indoor hard courts. It was the sixth edition of the tournament and part of the 2016 ITF Women's Circuit, offering a total of $50,000 in prize money. It took place in Ankara, Turkey, from 19–25 December 2016.

Singles main draw entrants

Seeds 

 1 Rankings as of 12 December 2016

Other entrants 
The following players received wildcards into the singles main draw:
  Ayla Aksu
  Berfu Cengiz
  Selin Övünç
  İpek Öz

The following players received entry from the qualifying draw:
  Mihaela Buzărnescu
  Ganna Poznikhirenko
  Raluca Georgiana Șerban
  Ana Vrljić

The following players received entry by lucky loser spots:
  Maria Marfutina
  Ekaterina Yashina

The following player received entry by using protected rankings:
  Vitalia Diatchenko

Champions

Singles

 Ivana Jorović def.  Vitalia Diatchenko, 6–4, 7–5

Doubles

 Anna Blinkova /  Lidziya Marozava def.  Sabina Sharipova /  Ekaterina Yashina, 4–6, 6–3, [11–9]

External links 
 2016 Ankara Cup at ITFtennis.com
 Official website 

2010s in Ankara
2016 in Turkey
2016 in Turkish tennis
2016 ITF Women's Circuit
December 2016 sports events in Turkey
Ankara Cup